is a Japanese martial arts term for a kind of psychological pressure. The seme is the one inflicting something on to the uke. It is also an attitude meant to disrupt the opponent's sense of confidence and resolution, prior to an attack.

The term is mostly used in kendo and in karatedo doshinkan.

References

See also
 "Uke" and "Seme" in yaoi

Japanese martial arts terminology
Kendo

de:Seme